Antimacy is the third and final full-length studio album  by Canadian post-hardcore band Dead and Divine. It was released on August 11, 2011.

Overview
The band officially released the name for their next upcoming album titled Antimacy on January 25 on their Myspace. Antimacy debuted at #53 on the Canadian Albums Chart. 
Chris Le-Masters Commented :I want these songs to mean something to people – even if it’s just a fraction of what they mean to us. We just want to play them for people,” and for Dead and Divine, it doesn’t matter if its 5 or 500 in front of them, “as long as they fuckin’ bring it – rest assured, we will!

Track listing

Charts

Personnel
Dead and Divine
 Matt Tobin - Vocals
 Chris Le-Masters - Guitar
 Sebastian Leuth - Guitar
 Kellan Lindsay - Bass 
 Kelly Bilan - Drums
Production
 Jordan Valeriote - Production

References 

2011 albums
Dead and Divine albums
Albums with cover art by Sons of Nero